John William Buckley (24 November 1903 – 13 April 1985) was an English footballer who made 349 appearances in the Football League playing for Doncaster Rovers and Lincoln City. He then moved into non-league football with Grantham, with whom he came runner-up in the Midland League in 1936–37. He played as a right back.

References

1903 births
1985 deaths
People from Prudhoe
Footballers from Northumberland
English footballers
Association football fullbacks
Prudhoe Castle F.C. players
Doncaster Rovers F.C. players
Lincoln City F.C. players
Grantham Town F.C. players
English Football League players
Midland Football League players